The River's Edge is a 1957 film noir adventure, crime, and drama DeLuxe CinemaScope film directed by Allan Dwan and starring Ray Milland, Anthony Quinn and Debra Paget. The picture is based on the unpublished short story "The Higher Mountain" by Harold Jacob Smith. Location filming was done in Amecameca and Iztaccihuatl in Mexico. The supporting cast features Harry Carey, Jr. and Chubby Johnson.

Plot
Nardo Denning stops to fill up at a New Mexico gas station. He asks a lot of questions about Ben Cameron, a struggling rancher who married a pretty redhead after he returned from Korea. 

At the ranch, Meg, the redhead, wearing denim short shorts and pink mules, awkwardly empties a bucket from the porch. The bull breaks through a fence and bowls Ben over while he brands a steer. In the shabby little house, Meg takes a shower at the wrong time and is covered in mud. She has ignored Ben's warnings about this and countless other aspects of ranch life. As she packs to leave, we learn that she would be serving 9 years in a California penitentiary for parole violation if Ben had not married her. She would stay, but “there isn't any love, and you just can't live without that.” She thinks her love for the man who got her in trouble and abandoned her, has turned to hate, .but she can't be sure. 

Denning knocks at the door. He makes eye contact with Meg, and the soundtrack plays “You'll never know how much I love you…” Denning wants Ben to guide him on an illegal “hunting” trip to Mexico. He refuses and asks Denning to give Meg a lift to town. “This is the way you wanted it,” she says. Ben rummages in a drawer to retrieve a photograph—it is Denning.

Denning books into the same hotel as Meg. They dance to “You'll Never Know” and remember their days as con artists. Denning has a $1,000,000 job “wrapped up.” She confesses she still loves him. Ben follows them, but they drive away. 

Border patrol Officer Castleton stops them, and when he opens the trunk, Denning backs over him. Meg flees screaming. Denning crashes into a boulder. He takes a metal briefcase from the trunk. They walk. Ben is with the Sheriff when Officer Castleton's dying words describe Denning's car and the redhead. He finds Denning and Meg at his ranch. Ben wants her to go to the police, but Denning pulls a gun. He eventually agrees to give Ben $10,000. Ben sees in a mirror that the case is full of money.

Denning and Meg ride in a caravan while Ben drives the truck. In the rearview mirror, he sees them embrace. In the morning, they run the vehicles over a cliff and walk. They pause at a crock face next to the camp of Ben's friend Whiskers, an old prospector. He sells them a rope. While Ben hauls Denning up, the case opens, scattering bills. Denning shoots Whiskers.

They walk through the night to avoid the Papago Reservation. Denning tries to soothe Meg's fears. She tells him they are close to the border. They leave $10,000 with the sleeping Ben and go. When two farmers appear, Meg runs to them, screaming for help, injuring her arm on a barbed wire fence. Ben has followed them. He uses the farmer's rifle to get Denning's pistol. Meg lied to Denning. The border is days away. She realized he is a killer. While they rest, she tells Ben she is “cured.”

Later, during a thunderstorm, Meg collapses. They find a cave, but everything is wet. Ben starts a fire with his share of the money. He demands more and they fight, disturbing a rattlesnake. Meg shoots it with the rifle Ben has concealed.  Ben lances the deadly infection in her arm. She asks: Would he wait for her if she went back to jail? “'Til you're a little old lady.” Ben warms Meg in his arms. In the morning, Denning takes the gun from the sleeping man, but Ben has altered the cartridges. The men fight, and Ben is pinned under boulder. He gives Denning a choice of paths: to an airport or to a village that will send them help. 

Denning tries to stop a truck in the dark and is knocked into the gorge, bills flying everywhere. Ben and Meg find the money and Denning's broken body. He was going for help. They bury him. “Let's go home and face the music.” Ben says.

Cast
 Ray Milland as Nardo Denning
 Anthony Quinn as Ben Cameron
 Debra Paget as Meg Cameron
 Harry Carey, Jr. as Chet
 Chubby Johnson as Whiskers
 Byron Foulger as Barry
 Tom McKee as U.S. Border Patrol Captain
 Frank Gerstle as Harry Castleton

See also
 List of American films of 1957

References

External links
 
 
 
 

1957 films
American crime drama films
1950s crime films
20th Century Fox films
Films directed by Allan Dwan
1957 adventure films
Films based on short fiction
Films shot in Mexico
1950s English-language films
1950s American films